Kagiso Media is the largest black-owned media corporation in South Africa. Its primary assets include:

Knowledge Factory
East Coast Radio
Jacaranda FM
JUTA publishing

History
On 29 October 2008, the Competition Tribunal issued a Merger Clearance Certificate approving the merger between Kagiso Media Ltd and Urban Brews Studios (Pty) Ltd unconditionally.

Recent news
South African black investment group, Kagiso Tiso Holdings bid $187 million in September 2013, to take Kagiso Media private, offering a substantial premium to minority shareholders.

In October 2017, Kagiso Media launched an app SoundBar with 12 different Internet music stations.

References

Mass media companies of South Africa